Faraar is a 2015 Indian Punjabi-language film starring Gippy Grewal and Kainaat Arora in lead roles. Gippy Grewal played a double role character in the movie. Movie was released on 28 August 2015.

Plot
Ekam, a young man from Punjab, India is just admitted by a university based in Los Angeles, United States and is about to fly to America as dreamed by most Punjabi. On the airplane, Ekam meets Jasmine, a US resident.

When Ekam is crossing US border of entry at Los Angeles airport, he is stopped by border officers who are not denying his entry, but to arrest him. Police tells him that he resembles a criminal in Los Angeles responsible for the death of 3 civilians and 2 cops. The criminal is named Shinda and was believed to have died in a blast, until now. Police now believe Shinda did not die but is now entering the US with a new identity Ekam. Ekam now needs to prove he is not Shinda, but simply looks like him. Ekam knows no one in the US, so he calls Jasmine for help, who contacted a Punjabi lawyer for him—Karanvir Jatana.

After a brief investigation of Ekam's background, Jatana takes his case. He and Jasmine later visit Shinda's house to collect evidence for Ekam. They find a diary believed to belong to Sunny, Shinda's cousin and best friend, which tells them the story of Shinda and Sunny.

Shinda was an illegal immigrant in the US who made living by participating in illegal fighting competition. Sunny once lost US$100,000 in gambling, 80,000 of which were borrowed from a famous mafia Frank, who threatened to kill Sunny if he cannot return the debt within two days. To repay debt for Sunny, Shinda had no choice but to make a deal with Kaptaan, another famous mafia who wanted Shinda to fight in a more brutal fighting competition—to beat the rival to death.

Shinda made it by beating his rival to death, and Kaptaan was therefore very impressed by Ekam and wanted Ekam to work for him. Ekam only needed one amount of money to repay Sunny's debt, so he rejected and humiliated Kaptaan. Kaptaan later kidnapped Shinda's girlfriend Nicky and demanded ransom of US$500,000. Kaptaan's plan was to leave Shinda no choice but to work for him for the ransom money. However, Shinda immediately realized it was Kaptaan's plot and rejected to work for him, vowing to pay the ransom by himself.

Shinda did not collect enough money for the ransom, but instead rescued Nicky by killing 5 of the kidnappers, 2 of whom were later found to be police from news reports. That's how Shinda realized police were on Kaptaan's side. The diary ends with Shinda, Sunny and Nicky went to meet Kaptaan.

Jatana decides to find more evidence by visiting Sunny's girlfriend Preeti. Jatana, along with Ekam, are shocked to see Nicky's photo shown by Preeti, which turns out to be nobody but Jasmine. The two angrily confront Jasmine, who confesses she is indeed Nicky and hided her identity to protect Ekam. Jasmine/Nicky tells them the following story untold in the diary.

Sunny was shot dead by Kaptaan, and Nicky and Shinda were later on the run from cops. Police finally found them, and Sihnda was killed in an accidental blast during the encounter just in front of Nicky.

Nicky later testifies in the court that she witnessed Shinda's death, making the judge believe Ekam is not Shinda and find him not guilty.

Jatana later learns that Ekam is Shinda by making a phone call to Ekam's claimed mother. Ekam/Shinda tells him that he faked his identity to re-enter the US for revenge.

Shinda contacts Kaptaan and the two fix their duel. During the duel, Shinda kills Kaptaan.

Cast
Gippy Grewal in a dual role as Shinda and Ekam
Kainaat Arora as Jasmine/Nikki
Jaggi Singh as Kaptaan
Rahul Nath as Sunny, Shinda's brother

Reception

Box office
Faraar collected overall  from 84 screens at the overseas box office in the first weekend making it third highest opening of 2015 after Sardaar Ji and Angrej.

Critical response
Jasmine Singh of The Tribune gave 4 stars out of 5 and termed movie as good to watch.

Track List

References

External links
 

2015 films
Punjabi-language Indian films
2010s Punjabi-language films
Films scored by Bohemia
Films scored by Dr Zeus
Films scored by Rahat Fateh Ali Khan
Films scored by Jatinder Shah
Films directed by Baljit Singh Deo